The Parti marxiste–léniniste du Québec fielded twenty-three candidates in the 2008 provincial election, none of whom were elected. Information about these candidates may be found on this page.

Candidates

Chapleau: Pierre Soublière
Pierre Soublière, a teacher, has been a Marxist-Leninist party candidate in four federal and four provincial elections. He has also contributed articles to the party's paper, TML Daily. He is a member of NOWAR-PAIX; during the 2008 election, he called for an anti-war government and for people from the workplace to be elected to parliament.

Châteauguay: Hélène Héroux
Hélène Héroux has been a Marxist-Leninist candidate in six federal and six provincial elections. In 2006, she identified as a cashier.

Hull: Gabriel Girard-Bernier

Gabriel Girard-Bernier is a political activist in the Outaouais region. He was the student association president at Cégep de l'Outaouais and has been active in the Canadian anti-war movement. A 2006 article listed him as a twenty-two-year-old journalism student. He has been a Marxist-Leninist candidate in three federal elections and three provincial elections and has written for TML Daily, the party's paper. In 2008, Girard-Bernier wrote a piece condemning the New Democratic Party's support for "asymmetrical federalism" and supporting Quebec's right to self-determination up to and including the right of succession.

Notre-Dame-de-Grâce: Linda Sullivan
Linda Sullivan has run as a Marxist-Leninist candidate in three federal and three provincial elections. She identified as a student in 2006 and as an events coordinator in 2008.

References

Candidates in Quebec provincial elections
Quebec 2008